Pavel Kamesch (born 9 December 1974) is a former Slovak football goalkeeper.

External links
fksenica.eu at fksenica.sk 

1974 births
Living people
Slovak footballers
Slovak expatriate footballers
Association football goalkeepers
Czech First League players
SK Sigma Olomouc players
FK Senica players
Enosis Neon Paralimni FC players
AEP Paphos FC players
ENTHOI Lakatamia FC players
Slovak Super Liga players
Cypriot First Division players
Cypriot Second Division players
Expatriate footballers in Cyprus
Sportspeople from Banská Bystrica